Events from the year 1726 in Russia

Incumbents
 Monarch – Catherine I

Events

  
 
  
  
 
 
  Smolensk Governorate
 Supreme Privy Council

Births
 Aksinya Sergeeva

Deaths

References

1726 in Russia
Years of the 18th century in the Russian Empire